Enrique Labrador Ruiz (May 11, 1902 – November 10, 1991) was a Cuban journalist, novelist, essayist, short story writer, and poet.

Biography
Enrique Labrador Ruiz, Cuban journalist, novelist, essayist, short story writer, and poet, was born in Sagua la Grande, Cuba, on May 11, 1902. He was a member of the Academia Cubana de la Lengua and also of the Academia Norteamericana de la Lengua Española. Labrador Ruiz was a well-learned and traveled man who created his own style of writing novels, which he called gaseiforme. In 1933, he published his first novel in this style, El laberinto de sí mismo, which forms a trilogy with Cresival (1936) and Anteo (Novela gaseiforme) (1940). With his collection of short stories, El gallo en el espejo (1953), he established his cuentería cubiche style.

In 1976, Labrador Ruiz and his wife María (Cheché) were exiled from Cuba. After residing in Spain and Venezuela, they moved to and maintained their permanent residence in Miami, Florida. During his years of exile, Labrador Ruiz wrote for many literary journals and newspapers, including Réplica (Miami), El Diario de Caracas, and Linden Lane Magazine.

Enrique Labrador Ruiz received numerous awards and honors for his works of literature. In Cuba, Conejito Ulán won the Hernández Catá Prize in 1946, and in 1950 his novel Sangre hambrienta won the Premio Nacional de Literatura. Some of his most important works are: El gallo en el espejo (1953), El pan de los muertos (1958), and his final work, Cartas a la carte (1991).

Enrique Labrador Ruiz died in Miami on November 10, 1991.

Works or publications

See also
 Cuban American literature
 List of Cuban-American writers

Notes and references

Further reading

External links
 The Enrique Labrador Ruiz papers are available at the Cuban Heritage Collection, University of Miami Libraries. The Enrique Labrador Ruiz papers consist primarily of the manuscripts of his articles and essays written in exile and includes that of his final book, Cartas a la carte (1991).
 Selected items from the Enrique Labrador Ruiz papers are available through the University of Miami Libraries Digital Collections portal.

1902 births
1991 deaths
People from Sagua la Grande
Cuban emigrants to the United States
Exiles of the Cuban Revolution in the United States
Cuban male novelists
Cuban male poets
Cuban journalists
Male journalists
20th-century Cuban novelists
20th-century Cuban poets
20th-century male writers
20th-century journalists